Janani D/O Madhavan (season 2) is a 2017 Singaporean Tamil-language drama that aired on MediaCorp Vasantham from 6 January 2017 to 31 March 2017 on every Friday at 8:00PM SST for 13 episodes. The show starred Sanchala, Shabir, Bharathi Rani, Jaynesh, Rishi Kumar and Kokila and Directed and writer by Jaya Rathakrishnanby.

Cast

Main cast
 Sanchala as Janani
 Shabir as Madhavan
 Bharathi Rani as Miss Oviya
 Jaynesh as Santhosh Subramaniam
 Rishi Kumar as Mr.K.Cjho
Mahesh as a passerby in Guest Appearance
 Kokila as Granny
 Muzammil as Munesh
 Bhama Nair as Shami

Children cast
 Yogeshwari Preshant
 Aayanaa
 Katijah 
 Ganga Kannan
 Aishwarya
 Avighnaa Kaavery
 Kamallesh Veeraa
 Anbu Navin
 Avineesh

Soundtrack

Episodes

References

External links 
 Vasantham Official Website
 Vasantham Facebook
 Janani D/O Madhavan Serial Episode
 Janani D/O Madhavan Facebook

2017 Tamil-language television seasons